Victor Swenson (1935–2019) was the founding executive director of the Vermont Humanities Council and the namesake for the Victor R. Swenson Humanities Educator Award. Swenson started work at the Humanities Council on New Year's Day, 1974 in Hyde Park, Vermont, with "a picnic table... and a folding chair and got to work." His early work was "...to travel the state, talk to interesting people explain this newfangled Vermont Council on the Humanities and Public Issues as we were called in those days and encourage people to send us grant applications." with their early budget of $140,000. By the time Swenson retired in 2002 after 28 years with the organization, it had eleven employees and supported 2500 events in all of Vermont's fourteen counties.

Education
Swenson received a bachelor's degree from Oberlin College an M.A. and history from George Washington University and his Ph.D. from Johns Hopkins specializing in the Middle East. He taught for four years at the University of Massachusetts, at Oberlin College for a year and then taught at Johnson State College.

Personal life
Swenson was raised in Indiana. His father was a chemist. He was married to the poet and professor Judy Yarnall. They lived in Vermont. He had two daughters from a previous marriage to the painter Sarah Belchetz-Swenson.

References

1935 births
2019 deaths
American educators